The Fillbach Brothers (Matt Fillbach and Shawn Fillbach) are comic book artists, known for penciling the Dark Horse Comics Star Wars: Clone Wars Adventures series.

Career
Matt Fillbach and Shawn Fillbach started out by producing creator-owned projects such as Captain Freebird (Broken Heroes) and, after their run on Clone Wars Adventures, Maxwell Strangewell and Roadkill: A Jim Kowalksi Adventure. They have also contributed three volumes to a Clone Wars series of graphic novellas from Dark Horse.

Additionally, the Fillbach Brothers did an anthology webcomic, Roninspoon Theater, that was updated weekly.

The Fillbach Brothers are currently co-writing with Dave Land and handling the art chores for the monthly title Werewolves on the Moon: Versus Vampires? from Dark Horse Comics.

Bibliography
Captain Freebird (Broken Heroes), Sirius Entertainment, 1998, 
 "Smuggler's Blues" in Star Wars Tales #14, Dark Horse Comics, 1999
Star Wars: Clone Wars Adventures, Dark Horse Comics, 2004–2008
Maxwell Strangewell, Dark Horse Comics, 2007, 
Roadkill: A Jim Kowalksi Adventure, Dark Horse Comics, 2008, 
Star Wars: The Clone Wars - Shipyards of Doom, Dark Horse Comics] 
Star Wars: The Clone Wars - The Colossus of Destiny, Dark Horse Comics, 2009, 
Star Wars: The Clone Wars - Crash Course, Dark Horse Comics, 2009, 
Werewolves on the Moon: Versus Vampires?, Dark Horse Comics, 2009

Notes

References

Matt and Shawn Fillbach, at Dark Horse

External links

The Fillbach Brothers Comic Art Fans page

Living people
Year of birth missing (living people)
American comics artists